Anthracene is a solid polycyclic aromatic hydrocarbon (PAH) of formula C14H10, consisting of three fused benzene rings. It is a component of coal tar. Anthracene is used in the production of the red dye alizarin and other dyes. Anthracene is colorless but exhibits a blue (400–500 nm peak) fluorescence under ultraviolet radiation.

Occurrence and production
Coal tar, which contains around 1.5% anthracene, remains a major source of this material.  Common impurities are phenanthrene and carbazole. The mineral form of anthracene is called freitalite and is related to a coal deposit. A classic laboratory method for the preparation of anthracene is by cyclodehydration of o-methyl- or o-methylene-substituted diarylketones in the so-called Elbs reaction, for example from o-tolyl phenyl ketone.

Reactions

Reduction
Reduction of anthracene with alkali metals yields the deeply colored radical anion salts M+[anthracene]− (M = Li, Na, K).   Hydrogenation gives 9,10-dihydroanthracene, preserving the aromaticity of the two flanking rings.

Cycloadditions
Anthracene photodimerizes by the action of UV light:

The dimer, called dianthracene (or sometimes paranthracene), is connected by a pair of new carbon-carbon bonds, the result of the [4+4] cycloaddition. It reverts to anthracene thermally or with UV irradiation below 300 nm. Substituted anthracene derivatives behave similarly. The reaction is affected by the presence of oxygen.

Anthracene also reacts with dienophile singlet oxygen in a [4+2]-cycloaddition (Diels–Alder reaction):

With electrophiles
Chemical oxidation occurs readily, giving anthraquinone, C14H8O2 (below), for example using hydrogen peroxide and vanadyl acetylacetonate.

Electrophilic substitution of anthracene occurs at the 9 position.  For example, formylation affords 9-anthracenecarboxaldehyde.  Substitution at other positions is effected indirectly, for example starting with anthroquinone.  Bromination of anthracene gives 9,10-dibromoanthracene.

Uses
Anthracene is converted mainly to anthraquinone, a precursor to dyes.

Niche
Anthracene, a wide band-gap organic semiconductor is used as a scintillator for detectors of high energy photons, electrons and alpha particles.  Plastics, such as polyvinyltoluene, can be doped with anthracene to produce a plastic scintillator that is approximately water-equivalent for use in radiation therapy dosimetry.  Anthracene's emission spectrum peaks at between 400 nm and 440 nm.

It is also used in wood preservatives, insecticides, and coating materials.

Anthracene is commonly used as a UV tracer in conformal coatings applied to printed wiring boards.  The anthracene tracer allows the conformal coating to be inspected under UV light.

Derivatives

A variety of anthracene derivatives find specialized uses.  Derivatives having a hydroxyl group are 1-hydroxyanthracene and 2-hydroxyanthracene, homologous to phenol and naphthols, and hydroxyanthracene (also called anthrol, and anthracenol) are pharmacologically active.  
Anthracene may also be found with multiple hydroxyl groups, as in 9,10-dihydroxyanthracene.

Learned uses of Anthracene, includes in the synthesis of Bisantrene, Trazitiline, Benzoctamine & BRN 2382808 (antidepressant with CNS stimulant properties). 

In addition, P. Rajagopalan reported a cycloaddition antidepressant made from anthracene with a potency that easily surpasses amitriptyline or imipramine.

Occurrence
Anthracene, as many other polycyclic aromatic hydrocarbons, is generated during combustion processes. Exposure to humans happens mainly through tobacco smoke and ingestion of food contaminated with combustion products.

Toxicology
Many investigations indicate that anthracene is noncarcinogenic: "consistently negative findings in numerous in vitro and in vivo genotoxicity tests". Early experiments suggested otherwise because crude samples were contaminated with other polycyclic aromatic hydrocarbons.  Furthermore, it is readily biodegraded in soil.  It is especially susceptible to degradation in the presence of light.

See also
 9,10-Dithioanthracene, derivative with two thiol groups added to the central ring
 Phenanthrene
 Tetracene

References

Cited sources

External links

 Image of anthracene crystals
 
 IARC – Monograph 32
 National Pollutant Inventory – Polycyclic Aromatic Hydrocarbon Fact Sheet
 European Chemicals Agency – ECHA
 

Organic semiconductors
Phosphors and scintillators
IARC Group 3 carcinogens
Anthracenes
Ionising radiation detectors
Acenes
PBT substances
Polycyclic aromatic hydrocarbons